Sir John Davidson Beazley,  (13 September 1885 – 6 May 1970) was a British classical archaeologist and art historian, known for his classification of Attic vases by artistic style. He was Professor of Classical Archaeology and Art at the University of Oxford from 1925 to 1956.

Early life
Beazley was born in Glasgow, Scotland on 13 September 1885, to Mark John Murray Beazley (died 1940) and Mary Catherine Beazley née Davidson (died 1918). He was educated at King Edward VI School, Southampton and Christ's Hospital, Sussex. He then attended Balliol College, Oxford where he read Literae Humaniores: he received firsts in both Mods and Greats. He graduated with a Bachelor of Arts (BA) degree in 1907. While at Oxford he became a close friend of the poet James Elroy Flecker.

Academic career
After graduating, Beazley spent time at the British School at Athens. He then returned to University of Oxford as a student (equivalent to fellow) and tutor in Classics at Christ Church.

During World War I, Beazley served in military intelligence. For most of the war he worked in Room 40 (Cryptanalysis) of the Admiralty's Naval Intelligence Division, where his colleagues included his fellow-archaeologist Winifred Lamb. He held the temporary rank of second lieutenant from March to October 1916 when he was on secondment to the British Army.

In 1925, he became Lincoln Professor of Classical Archaeology and Art at the University of Oxford, a position he held until 1956. He specialised in Greek decorated pottery (particularly black-figure and red-figure), and became a world authority on the subject. He adapted the art-historical method initiated by Giovanni Morelli to attribute the specific "hands" (style) of specific workshops and artists, even where no signed piece offered a name, e.g. the Berlin Painter, whose production he first distinguished. He looked at the sweep of classical pottery—major and minor pieces—to construct a history of workshops and artists in ancient Athens. The first English edition of his book, Attic Red-figure Vase-painters, appeared in 1942 (in German as Attische Vasenmaler des rotfigurigen Stils, 1925).

Later life

Beazley retired in 1956, but continued to work until his death in Oxford, on 6 May 1970. His personal archive was purchased by the University of Oxford in 1964. It was originally accommodated in the Ashmolean Museum, but in 2007 it moved into the Ioannou Centre for Classical and Byzantine Studies as part of the new Classical Art Research Centre.

Honours
Beazley was elected as a Fellow of the British Academy (FBA) in 1927. In 1954, he was elected a Foreign Honorary Member of the American Academy of Arts and Sciences.

Beazley was appointed a Knight Bachelor in 1949, and therefore granted the title sir. He was appointed to the Order of the Companions of Honour in the 1959 New Year Honours "for services to scholarship".

Personal life
In 1919, Beazley married a widow, Marie Ezra (née Bloomfield), whose first husband had been killed in World War I. She died in 1967.

His stepdaughter, from Marie's previous marriage, Giovanna Marie Therese Babette "Mary" Ezra married Irish poet Louis MacNeice.

There is a notebook in Beazley's hand in Bodleian Archives & Manuscripts, the Bodleian Library, Oxford (MS. Eng. misc. e. 1390), containing his notes on Greek literature and sculpture and on Roman history, but also his illustrations of classical statuary and his sketched caricatures of some contemporaries.

References

External links
 Classical Art Research Centre; location of the Beazley Archive
 Dictionary of Art Historians
 

1885 births
1970 deaths
Alumni of Balliol College, Oxford
English classical scholars
British art historians
Classical archaeologists
British archaeologists
Scholars of ancient Greek pottery
People educated at Christ's Hospital
Fellows of Lincoln College, Oxford
Fellows of Christ Church, Oxford
People associated with the Ashmolean Museum
Knights Bachelor
Fellows of the American Academy of Arts and Sciences
Members of the Order of the Companions of Honour
Fellows of the British Academy
Classical scholars of the University of Oxford
Lincoln Professors of Classical Archaeology and Art
20th-century archaeologists
20th-century English male writers